Custer County Courthouse may refer to:

Custer County Courthouse (Colorado), Westcliffe, Colorado, (1929) designed by John J. Huddart
Custer County Courthouse (Broken Bow, Nebraska), listed on the National Register of Historic Places (NRHP)
Custer County Courthouse (Callaway, Nebraska), NRHP-listed, also known as "First Custer County Courthouse"
Custer County Courthouse (South Dakota), Custer, South Dakota, NRHP-listed